Fulltime Killer is a 2001 Hong Kong action film produced and directed by Johnnie To, and also written, produced and directed by Wai Ka-fai, and also produced by and starring Andy Lau. The film was released on 3 August 2001.

The film is based on Pang Ho-cheung's novel of the same name. It is informally known by Hong Kong English title You & I.

Plot
Based on a book by Hong Kong filmmaker Pang Ho-cheung, Fulltime Killer protagonist O is a hitman being challenged by new hotshot Lok Tok-wah. O has lived a life of seclusion as the number one hitman in Asia. The woman living at his contact address is captured after O foils a set-up by his boss. He then goes on the run while trying to fend off his adversary. The last part of the movie focuses on an Interpol detective's attempt to write the story of Tok and O.

Alternate ending
The film has two endings. The normal one that appeared in theaters and the special ending for Malaysia where O and Chin end up being caught by police. This was supposedly done as per special request to show that "Crime doesn't pay".

Cast
 Andy Lau as Lok Tok-wah
 Takashi Sorimachi as O
 Simon Yam as Albert Lee
 Kelly Lin as Ms. Chin
 Cherrie Ying as Gigi
 Lam Suet as Fat Ice
 Rocky Lai as Bald thug
 Liu Chun-hung as Man in Bangkok Jail
 Teddy Li as C7
 Ernest Mauser as Priest
 Wong Chi-wai as Policeman in  Singapore
 Lam Chung-kei as Cop

Home media
On 29 March 2004, DVD was released by Tartan Asia Extreme at the United Kingdom in Region 2.

Reception 
Fulltime Killer has a rating of 56% on Rotten Tomatoes.

See also
 Andy Lau filmography
 Johnnie To filmography
 List of Hong Kong films of 2001
 List of Hong Kong films

References

External links
 
 
 
 
 Fulltime Killer at LoveHKFilm.com
 HK cinemagic entry

2001 films
2001 action thriller films
2000s Cantonese-language films
Films based on Chinese novels
Films about contract killing
Films directed by Johnnie To
Films directed by Wai Ka-Fai
Films produced by Andy Lau
Films set in Hong Kong
Films set in Japan
Films set in Macau
Films set in Kuala Lumpur
Films with screenplays by Wai Ka-fai
Films shot in Thailand
Gun fu films
Hong Kong films about revenge
Hong Kong action thriller films
Milkyway Image films
Police detective films
2000s Hong Kong films